Echiurida is a suborder of the order Echiuroidea, an order of polychaete worms.

Families
The following families are classified within the suborder:

Echiuridae Quatrefages, 1847
Thalassematidae Forbes & Goodsir, 1841
Urechidae Monro, 1927

References

Echiurans